Lois Sherman Hagarty (born September 28, 1948) is a former Republican member of the Pennsylvania House of Representatives. She was first elected on March 11, 1980.  Since 2003, Hagarty has been a principal at State Street Advisors, a lobbying and political consulting firm based in Philadelphia and Harrisburg, Pennsylvania.

References

Republican Party members of the Pennsylvania House of Representatives
Women state legislators in Pennsylvania
1948 births
Living people
21st-century American women